() or Route 33 is a national road in the Southern Region of Iceland. It runs from Route 1 east of Selfoss to the intersection of Eyrarbakkavegur. It runs through the village of Stokkseyri.

References

Roads in Iceland